Kilistra was a town of ancient Lycaonia, inhabited in Roman times. 

Its site is located near Gökyurt, Meram, Konya Province, Turkey.

References

Populated places in ancient Lycaonia
Former populated places in Turkey
Roman towns and cities in Turkey
History of Konya Province